San Juan Juquila Vijanos is a town and municipality in Oaxaca in south-western Mexico. The municipality covers an area of 37 km². 
It is part of the Villa Alta District in the center of the Sierra Norte Region.

As of 2005, the municipality had a total population of 1908.

References

Municipalities of Oaxaca